Soulaimane Raissouni (born 5 June 1972) is a Moroccan journalist, editorialist, and human rights activist. He was working as the chief editor of the newspaper Akhbar Al Yaoum, being notable for his editorials, criticizing government corruption and advocating political reform. On May 22, 2020, Raissouni was arrested over charges of “indecent assault” against another man. His arrest triggered a movement of solidarity among his sympathizers, both in Morocco and internationally, alleging that his case is part of a defamation campaign targeting journalists and rights activists critical of Moroccan authorities.

After almost a year of imprisonment without a trial (being constantly postponed), Soulaimane Raissouni started on April 8, 2021, together with another detained journalist, Omar Radi, a hunger strike to press their demands to be freed. and obtain either "freedom, justice or death"

Soulaimane Raissouni is the brother of Ahmad al-Raysuni, and the uncle of Hajar Raissouni.

Arrest and Hunger Strike
On 22 May 2020, Soulaimane Raissouni was arrested after allegations published by a young man on Facebook, claiming that Raissouni committed indecent assault with violence and confinement against him in 2018. The identity of the young man is not known, and no proofs were presented together with the plaint.

Since that date, the trial date has been constantly postponed, while Raissouni remained detained. This common practice, consisting of the increasing use of pre-trial detention is described by many Moroccan rights groups as a human rights violation. On 8 April 2021, Raissouni decided to start a hunger strike to protest this situation. Although his health status is deteriorating, the journalist refuses to halt the strike. Several journalists, friends, colleagues, family members, and human rights activists have called for the judiciary to consider his situation.

On 24 May 2021 Mayssa Salama Ennaji, a Moroccan journalist, shared a photo of a traditional cloth used for burials in Islam, saying that Raissouni's wife bought it for him in case he dies due to this hunger strike.

On 9 July 2021, Moroccan justice sentenced Soulaimane Raissouni to five years in prison for “sexual assault”.

See also
Hajar Raissouni
Aboubakr Jamaï
Omar Radi
Ali Anouzla

References

Moroccan male journalists
Moroccan writers
Living people
Imprisoned journalists
Moroccan prisoners and detainees
Moroccan activists
1972 births